Churkin is a rural locality (a settlement) in Bolshemogoysky Selsoviet of Volodarsky District, Astrakhan Oblast, Russia. The population was 58 as of 2010. There are 3 streets.

Geography 
Churkin is located 24 km southeast of Volodarsky (the district's administrative centre) by road. Yamnoye is the nearest rural locality.

References 

Rural localities in Volodarsky District, Astrakhan Oblast